FFC Zuchwil 05 is a women's football club from Zuchwil, Switzerland. Founded in 1970 in Solothurn as the women's section of DFC Solothurn, which moved to Zuchwil twenty years later, the team was refounded in 2005 as FFC Zuchwil 05 after the Swiss Football Association allowed pure women's football clubs, taking its current name.

Zuchwil played in the Nationalliga A, the country's top category, from 2000 to 2011. Standing in the top positions of the table since 2002, it won the Nationalliga in 2007 and was the championship's runner-up in 2004, 2006 and 2008, taking part three times in the UEFA Women's Cup.

However, the team declined in subsequent seasons, ending 3rd to last in 2010 and 2nd to last the following year. Zuchwil couldn't make it into the top spots of the ensuing promotion round, and was relegated to the Nationalliga B for the 2011-12 season. As of the end of 2011 the team is last in the category's table.

Honours
 1 Swiss League (2007)

Record in UEFA competitions

References

External links 
Official website

Women's football clubs in Switzerland
2005 establishments in Switzerland